Golf at the 2011 Island Games was held from 28 June – 1 July 2011 at the Freshwater Bay Golf Club and Shanklin & Sandown Golf Club.

Medal table

Events

References
Golf at the 2011 Island Games

2011 Island Games
2011 in golf
2011